Bonifacio, officially the Municipality of Bonifacio, is a 4th class municipality in the province of Misamis Occidental, Philippines. According to the 2020 census, it had a population of 34,558 people.

Bonifacio town was established in 1942 by Don Demetrio P. Fernan, who was then the first mayor of Bonifacio.

Geography

Climate

Barangays

Bonifacio is politically subdivided into 28 barangays.

Demographics

Economy

References

External links
 [ Philippine Standard Geographic Code]
Philippine Census Information
Local Governance Performance Management System

Municipalities of Misamis Occidental